Trigona amalthea, commonly known as jandaíra-preta or sanharão in Brazil, is a species of eusocial stingless bee in the family Apidae and tribe Meliponini.

References 

amalthea
Hymenoptera of South America
Hymenoptera of Brazil
Insects described in 1789